Charles Stokes may refer to:
 Charles Stokes (artist) (1944–2008), American painter and sculptor
 Charles Stokes (collector) (c. 1784–1853), English stockbroker, amateur scientist, and art collector
 Charles Stokes (politician) (1902–1996), American politician, jurist, and lawyer
 Charles Stokes (trader) (1852–1895), Irish missionary turned trader
 Charles F. Stokes (1863–1931), inventor of the Stokes Litter